Ali bin Abdullah Al Khalifa (died August 11, 2009) was a Bahraini politician.

Career
Born in Muharraq, he earned a Bachelor of Medicine, Bachelor of Surgery from Cairo University and a Fellowship of Surgery from the Royal College of Physicians and Surgeons of Glasgow. He served as Medical Director at Bahrain Defence Force Hospital, Associate Professor at Arabian Gulf University, President of the Royal Academy of Physicians and Specialists in Bahrain, and President of the Arab Federation of Sports Medicine. He was appointed to the Consultative Council or Shura Council in 2002 and held the post until his death in 2009.

References

2009 deaths
House of Khalifa
Members of the Consultative Council (Bahrain)
Bahraini surgeons
Year of birth missing